The 1916 Columbus Panhandles season was their 11th season in existence. The team played in the Ohio League and posted a 7-5-0 record.

Schedule

Game notes

References
Pro Football Archives: 1916 Columbus Panhandles season

Columbus Panhandles seasons
Columbus Pan
Columbus Pan